DuVal High School (DHS) is a comprehensive science and technology public magnet high school in the Seabrook census-designated place in unincorporated Prince George's County, Maryland, United States, with a Lanham postal address. Prior to 2010 the U.S. Census Bureau defined the area containing DuVal High as being within the Goddard CDP.

The school serves: most of Seabrook CDP, all of Lanham CDP, portions of the Fairwood CDP, Glenn Dale, Landover, and Mitchellville CDPs, a portion of the City of Glenarden, and a small portion of the City of New Carrollton. It also serves a section of the former Goddard CDP.

History
DuVal High School opened in 1960 to relieve overcrowding from other local area high schools. The original building was a one-story, 38-classroom school situated in the formerly small village of Good Luck, Maryland. The historic primary school serving the same community (the "Good Luck Schoolhouse" or "Glen Dale Colored School") was built in 1899, expanded in 1915 but abandoned circa 1935, and became a private residence in 1938.

The school name honors Gabriel Duvall (or DuVal) (1752–1844), a Supreme Court Justice whose family formerly owned a local slave plantation. The spelling of the name now conforms with that used by his descendants.  DuVal held a number of public offices, including serving as the U.S. representative from Maryland's second district from November 11, 1794, to March 28, 1796, Chief Justice of Maryland's General Court from 1796 to 1802, and U.S. Comptroller of the Treasury from 1802 through 1811. Duvall also served on the United States Supreme Court, as associate justice (replacing fellow Marylander Samuel Chase) from 1811 until 1835, when he resigned due to old age.

Notable alumni

 Karen Allen, actress
 Madieu Williams, football player
 George Malley (athlete), distance runner
 Robert Dennis, sprinter
 Antoine Brooks, football player for the Pittsburgh Steelers
David Mills, journalist
Lio Rush (Professional Wrestler)

References

External links
 School Website

Lanham, Maryland
Public high schools in Maryland
Seabrook, Maryland
Schools in Prince George's County, Maryland
1960 establishments in Maryland
Educational institutions established in 1960